Island Command Greenland, or simply "GLK", was a Level.II authority responsible directly to the Defence Command.
It was, among other things, responsible for the military defense of Greenland, maritime and sovereignty maintenance and enforcement, as well as search and rescue.
Personnel assigned to the Danish liaison office at Thule Air Base (FOTAB) as well as the Sirius Patrol were also a part of the Greenland Command. Island Command Greenland was amalgamated with Island Command Faroes to a Joint Arctic Command on 31 October 2012.

It also functioned as NATO's Island Commander Greenland, formerly part of Allied Command Atlantic. ACLANT became Allied Command Transformation in 2003, and since then it was not clear exactly how the command now fits into the NATO Military Command Structure.

History
The Danish military can trace its activities in Greenland back to the time of Hans Egede. From the late 18th century up to World War II, personnel from the Danish military contributed very actively to the exploration of Greenland, by land, sea and air.

After the Second World War fishing inspections and sea measuring began again and the first dedicated Greenland command was established, called the "Greenland Maritime Command", located at Nuuk. On August 1, 1951 it changed name to the "Island Command Greenland", while simultaneously moving from Nuuk to the Naval base at Kangilinnguit, where it has been ever since.

Civilian duties
Under the stipulations of several international treaties, Denmark has agreed to keep and maintain a SAR (Search And Rescue) response organization in the Greenlandic area of responsibility. This organization was administered by the Greenland Command.
The organization was divided into three sections, Land, Maritime, and Air, in order to simplify the command structure, which is absolutely vital on SAR operations.

The Greenland Command is authorized to request additional support from naval vessels, police cutters, the Royal Danish Air Force, civilian ships, aircraft from Air Greenland, and US or Icelandic SAR units based in Iceland if need be.

Currently there are about 150 total civilian and military employees employed by the command, from both Danish and Greenlandic descent.

Winter in Grønnedal
https://web.archive.org/web/20060402233425/http://forsvaret.dk/glk - official Greenland Command site (Danish)
https://web.archive.org/web/20070606222040/http://dpc.dk/sw5407.asp - Danish Polar Centre (English)

See also 

 Arctic Command
 Danish realm
 Danish Navy
 Defence Command
 Danish Defence
 Greenland
 Faroe Islands
 Denmark

References

External links

Military of Denmark